The La Salle Explorers are the varsity sports teams from La Salle University in Philadelphia. The Explorers compete in NCAA Division I as members of the Atlantic 10 Conference. The men's and women's basketball teams are also participate in the Philadelphia Big 5. On June 3, 2019, Brian Baptiste was named Director of Athletics and Recreation effective August 1, 2019. Baptiste currently serves as Deputy AD for Capital Projects and Operations at Northwestern University.

Overview

The Explorers name 
The Explorers nickname derives from a famous mistake made by a local Philadelphia sportswriter. The writer thought the university was named after the French explorer Sieur de La Salle, when in fact it is named after St. Jean-Baptiste de la Salle. The nickname caught on, however, and has remained ever since.

The rivalry 
La Salle's major historic rival has been the Hawks of the Saint Joseph's University, especially in men's basketball.  Not only are both schools situated in Philadelphia, but they are also both Catholic, private institutions and are both members of both the Atlantic 10 and the Big 5.

National championships 
La Salle's teams have won two national championships: the 1954 NCAA Men's Division I Basketball Tournament and the 1980 AIAW Field Hockey Championship.

The school also won the 1952 National Invitation Tournament when that tournament was still considered to be on par with the NCAA tournament.

Sports sponsored 

A member of the Atlantic 10 Conference, La Salle University sponsors teams in 10 men's and 14 women's NCAA sanctioned sports, plus one men's sport that is not recognized by the NCAA. The most recently added varsity sports are women's golf and men's and women's water polo, all added for 2016–17.

Men's basketball 

The men's basketball team has won eight City Championships (four were shared). In addition to the National Championship and NIT Championship, La Salle was also a national finalist in the 1955 NCAA Men's Division I Basketball Tournament and was named the 53rd "Greatest College Basketball Program of All-Time" by Street & Smith's in January 2005.

Only Duke (7) and UCLA (4) have had more National Players of the Year than La Salle, which has had three--- Lionel Simmons, Michael Brooks, and Tom Gola. Tom Gola was listed on "ESPN's Countdown to the Greatest" College basketball players as #17.

Women's basketball 

The women's basketball team began play in the 1972–73 season, and has been to the NCAA Division I women's basketball tournament 5 times.

Football 

La Salle discontinued football at the end the 2007 season.

Club sports 
In addition to its varsity sports, La Salle also sponsors a number of club sports. These include:
Ice hockey
Men's Lacrosse
Men's Rugby
Ultimate Frisbee
Women's Rugby
Wrestling

Professional sports alumni

See also 

Philadelphia Sports Hall of Fame
Sports in Philadelphia#Collegiate sports

References

External links
 

 
Philadelphia Big 5